Miriama Naiobasali (born 30 December 1995) is a Fijian former footballer and current rugby sevens player. She has been a member of the Fiji women's national football team and the Fiji women's national rugby sevens team.

Early life
Naiobasali was raised in Naruto, Waimaro, Naitasiri.

Football career

Club career
Naiobasali has played for Lautoka in Fiji.

International career
Naiobasali capped for Fiji at senior level during the 2015 Pacific Games.

Rugby sevens career
Naiobasali represented Fiji at the 2018 Commonwealth Games.

Personal life
Naiobasali is fluent in English and Fijian.

References

1995 births
Living people
People from Naitasiri Province
Fijian women's footballers
Fiji women's international footballers
Fijian female rugby union players
Fijian rugby sevens players
Fiji international women's rugby sevens players
Commonwealth Games rugby sevens players of Fiji
Rugby sevens players at the 2018 Commonwealth Games
Women's association footballers not categorized by position